The 2009 Ladies European Tour was a series of golf tournaments for elite female golfers from around the world which took place from January through December 2009. The tournaments were sanctioned by the Ladies European Tour (LET).

The tour featured 21 official money events, as well as the Solheim Cup and the European Ladies Golf Cup. Sophie Gustafson won the Order of Merit with earnings of €281,315, ahead of Catriona Matthew. Gustafson participated in only four events, and Matthew only three events. Anna Nordqvist won Rookie of the Year honours, after finishing 13th in the Order of Merit.

Schedule

Major championships in bold.

Order of Merit rankings

External links
Official site of the Ladies European Tour
Ladies European Tour Information Centre

Ladies European Tour
Ladies European Tour
Ladies European Tour